The Central Queensland Herald was a newspaper published in Rockhampton, Queensland from 1930 to 1956; it was created with the merger of The Artesian  and The Capricornian.

History
The Central Queensland Herald was published from 2 January 1930 to 29 November 1956.

Digitisation 
The paper has been digitised as part of the Australian Newspapers Digitisation Program of the National Library of Australia.

See also
 List of newspapers in Australia

References

External links
 

Defunct newspapers published in Queensland
1930 establishments in Australia
Newspapers established in 1930
Rockhampton